William Lindsey Erwin (December 2, 1914 – December 29, 2010) was an American film, stage and television actor and cartoonist with over 250 television and film credits. A veteran character actor, he is widely known for his 1993 Emmy Award-nominated performance on Seinfeld, portraying the embittered, irascible retiree Sid Fields. He also made notable appearances on shows such as I Love Lucy and Star Trek: The Next Generation. In cinema, his most recognized role is that of Arthur Biehl, a kindly bellman at the Grand Hotel, in Somewhere in Time (1980).

Erwin was a self-taught cartoonist, published in The New Yorker, Playboy, and Los Angeles. He won a Los Angeles Drama Critics Circle Award, four Drama-Logue Awards, Gilmore Brown Award for Career Achievement, Pacific Pioneer Broadcasters' Diamond Circle Award, and Distinguished Alumnus Award from Angelo State University.

Early life
Erwin was born December 2, 1914, in Honey Grove, Texas. He earned a bachelor's degree in journalism from the University of Texas at Austin and a masters in theater arts from California's Pasadena Playhouse. Erwin later served as a captain in the United States Army Air Forces during World War II era.

Career

Stage
Erwin acted in productions at the Pasadena Playhouse, the Laguna Beach Playhouse, the La Jolla Playhouse, and other venues in the Los Angeles area.

Film
In the late 1950s, Erwin was in such films as Man from Del Rio (1956) and The Night Runner (1957), before playing Jack Nicholson's father in The Cry Baby Killer, Nicholson's first starring role in 1958. The long out-of-print film was released on DVD on November 22, 2006. He had credited small roles in films such as The Christine Jorgensen Story (1970), How Awful About Allan (1970), Candy Stripe Nurses (1974) and Tarantulas: The Deadly Cargo (1977), before he co-starred alongside Christopher Reeve and Jane Seymour in the romantic fantasy Somewhere in Time (1980) as Arthur Biehl, the Grand Hotel's venerable bellman, and attended annual reunions of cast, crew, and fans of the cult classic at the Grand Hotel on Mackinac Island, Michigan.

Erwin also appeared in numerous films by John Hughes, with cameos in Planes, Trains and Automobiles (1987), She's Having a Baby (1988), Home Alone (1990) and Dennis the Menace (1993). Hughes often paired him with Billie Bird playing his wife. His later film career included roles in Invitation to Hell (1984), Naked Gun : The Final Insult (1994), Things to Do in Denver When You're Dead (1995), Menno's Mind (1997), Chairman of the Board (1998), Forces of Nature (1999), Inferno (1999) and A Crack in the Floor (2001).

Television
His television credits were far more numerous in the 1950s, having appeared in such television series as I Love Lucy, Crusader, Trackdown, Colgate Theatre, Perry Mason and The Rifleman. In the 1960s, Erwin appeared in television series such as: The Andy Griffith Show, Mister Ed, Maverick, The Twilight Zone, 87th Precinct, My Three Sons,  The Fugitive, Leave It to Beaver and Mannix.

In the 1970s, 1980s and 1990s, he appeared in Barnaby Jones, Cannon, Gunsmoke, Married... with Children, E/R, The Optimist, Highway to Heaven, Who's the Boss?, Growing Pains, Full House, The Golden Girls, Moonlighting, Star Trek: The Next Generation, Lois & Clark: The New Adventures of Superman and The Drew Carey Show.

In the Seinfeld episode ("The Old Man"), for which Erwin received an Emmy Award nomination for outstanding guest actor in a comedy series, he played Sid Fields, who participates in the Foster-A-Grandpa Program, which pairs him with Jerry Seinfeld. Erwin's crotchety, aggressive, foul-mouthed character ensures that the relationship is doomed from the beginning. Erwin later reunited with Michael Richards when he guest-starred on the short-lived The Michael Richards Show. In the 2000s, Erwin appeared on Monk, The West Wing, The King of Queens, Everwood and My Name Is Earl.

Other media
 
After Erwin began his theatrical career with the Laguna Beach and La Jolla playhouses in 1940, he worked as ventriloquist Edgar Bergen's stage manager for Bergen's 1941 tour of the country. 

Due to his resemblance to William Gaines, Sam Viviano redid Erwin's character as Gaines in the MAD Magazine spoof of Home Alone where the married couple sells their ticket to Kate McAllister.

Personal life
Erwin was married to actress and journalist Fran MacLachlan Erwin from 1948 to her death in 1995. They lived in the Hollywood Hills and had two sons, Michael and Timothy, and two daughters, Lindsey and Kelly.

Death
Erwin died from natural causes at his home in Studio City, California on December 29, 2010, aged 96. He lived near the production lot where Seinfeld was filmed.

Filmography

Film

Television

References

External links
 
 
 

1914 births
2010 deaths
Male actors from Texas
American cartoonists
American male film actors
American male stage actors
American male television actors
Angelo State University alumni
Moody College of Communication alumni
United States Army Air Forces officers
People from Honey Grove, Texas
People from Studio City, Los Angeles
20th-century American male actors
21st-century American male actors
Military personnel from Texas